John "Bala" Jones was a Wales international rugby union scrum-half who played club rugby for Aberavon and Devonport Albion RFC and county rugby for Glamorgan and Devon. He won just a single international cap, in 1901.

Rugby career
There is little information recorded about Jones, and no place of birth is recorded with the Welsh Rugby Union, though his nickname of "Bala" could refer to the town of Bala, as this was a common way to differentiate people with the surname Jones in Wales. He is recorded at being five foot five inches in height.

In 1897 Jones moved to Devon, and continued playing rugby, representing Devonport Albion and later the Devon county team. The Welsh Rugby Union, believed that Jones was taking payment for playing and declared him a professional player, which would prevent him playing under the union code for the rest of his career. Jones challenged the decision and was later reinstated as an amateur.

Jones won just a single cap for Wales, and at the time has returned to Wales and was playing rugby for Aberavon, becoming the third player to win a cap whilst representing the club after Dan Jones and Alfred Brice. Jones' international debut was in the opening game of the 1901 Home Nations Championship, played at the Cardiff Arms Park against England. Jones, the only new cap in the team that day, was brought in as a replacement for Lou Phillips, and was partnered at half-back with Newport's Llewellyn Lloyd. Wales won the match with an impressive 13-0 score line, but with a disappointing displays from the Welsh pack and Billy Bancroft at full-back. Jones was replaced in the very next game, replaced by the returning Phillips.

International matches played
Wales
  England 1901

Bibliography

References

Aberavon RFC players
Glamorgan County RFC players
Plymouth Albion R.F.C. players
Rugby union scrum-halves
Wales international rugby union players
Year of death missing
Year of birth missing